PopSugar Inc. is an American media and technology company that is the parent to the media property PopSugar (stylized POPSUGAR) and a monthly subscription business PopSugar Must Have. The company was founded in 2006 by married couple Brian and Lisa Sugar as a pop culture blog. The company is part of American digital holding company Vox Media.

History 
Husband and wife Brian Sugar and Lisa Sugar founded PopSugar, in 2006, after a suggestion by blogger Om Malik that Lisa turn her celebrity gossip hobby into a company.  Brian became CEO and Lisa Editor-in-Chief, and they added venture capitalist Michael Moritz to the board.

In 2007, the company acquired ShopStyle, a fashion shopping search engine, followed by acquisitions of Starbrand Media, FreshGuide, and Circle of Moms in 2012. In 2013, the company officially changed its name from Sugar Inc. to PopSugar, and announced that it was profitable and had grown to over 450 employees. In 2019, American digital holding company Group Nine Media acquired PopSugar in an all-stock transaction.

Operations
PopSugar Inc operates the brands PopSugar and PopSugar Must Have. PopSugar features lifestyle content targeted towards women 18–34, across topics such as beauty, entertainment, fashion, fitness, food, and parenting, on mobile, video, and social media.

PopSugar Must Have was a subscription service that sends subscribers a monthly box of items curated by PopSugar editors.  It also offered special edition boxes with retailers such as CFDA, Neiman Marcus, and Target. Summer 2020 was the final PopSugar Must Have box.

Headquartered in San Francisco, PopSugar is funded by Sequoia Capital and Institutional Venture Partners. The company also has offices in Chicago, London,  Los Angeles, and New York.

References

External links 

Fashion websites
Online retailers of the United States
2019 mergers and acquisitions
Internet properties established in 2006
2006 establishments in California
Companies based in San Francisco
Vox Media